Summit Preparatory Charter High School also known as Summit Prep, is a college preparatory and charter high school that was founded in 2003.  Summit Prep is the first school founded by the charter management organization (CMO) Summit Public Schools, which has eight schools in the San Francisco Bay Area and three in Washington state. It is part of the Sequoia Union High School District.

Academics

Summit Prep follows the personalized, project-based learning curriculum known as Summit Learning. The typical class size is about 25 students or less to one teacher. Unlike many typical schools with an elective for one period a day, Summit spreads it throughout the school year. Called "Expeditions", it is now taken in two-week periods, which are broken up by six weeks of regular classes in between.

The school runs all students through same or very similar curricula, with all students taking a standardized curriculum and some students taking extra/alternative courses. 100% of Summit Prep graduates meet or exceed the University of California's A-G college entrance requirements. All Summit Prep students take 6 or more AP® courses and attempt at least one AP® exam by graduation. Also, all students take Spanish language courses during their four years.

Statistics

Demographics
2015-2016
 412 students: 222 Male (53.9%), 190 Female (46.1%)

Awards and recognition
Year after year, Summit Prep is named one of America's Best High Schools by U.S. News & World Report and is awarded a gold medal for college readiness. For 2017, Summit Preparatory Charter High is ranked 21st within California, and the AP® participation rate 100 percent. The student body makeup is 51 percent male and 49 percent female, and the total minority enrollment is 75 percent. Summit Prep was also named one of America's Most Challenging High Schools by the Washington Post for 2017.

Summit Prep was listed as the #132 high school in the country in Newsweek'''s 2011 America's Best Public High Schools and among the top three in Northern California.  Newsweek counted Summit among the 10 Miracle High Schools for "taking students at all skill levels, from all strata, and turning out uniformly qualified graduates."

Summit Prep was named in the top 100 public high schools in the US and top 10 public high schools in California in the 2010 Newsweek'' ranking. It is one of five schools to which families are applying in the 2010 documentary Waiting for Superman.

See also

San Mateo County high schools

References

External links

Summit Preparatory Charter High School Athletics Official Website

Educational institutions established in 2003
High schools in San Mateo County, California
Charter high schools in California
Education in Redwood City, California
2003 establishments in California